Patrick Quinn (10 December 1885 – 2 January 1946) was an Irish track and field athlete who competed for Great Britain and Ireland in the 1912 Summer Olympics, coming eighth in the shot put competition.

He was born in Nenagh, County Tipperary, Ireland. Quinn joined the Dublin Metropolitan Police in 1905, serving in the Band Division, and won six Irish discus titles (1910, 1912, 1913, 1914, 1921, 1922) and four shot put titles (1912, 1913, 1914, 1921). He won the British AAA discus title in 1920.

References

1885 births
Irish male shot putters
Olympic athletes of Great Britain
Athletes (track and field) at the 1912 Summer Olympics
Sportspeople from County Tipperary
People from Nenagh
1946 deaths